DD Sikkim is a state owned television channel telecasting from Doordarshan.

See also
 List of programs broadcast by DD National
 All India Radio
 Ministry of Information and Broadcasting
 DD Direct Plus
 List of South Asian television channels by country

External links
 Doordarshan Official Internet site
 Doordarshan news site
 An article at PFC

Doordarshan
Foreign television channels broadcasting in the United Kingdom
Television channels and stations established in 1998
Indian direct broadcast satellite services
Mass media in Sikkim